Cells is a monthly peer-reviewed open-access scientific journal that covers all aspects of cell and molecular biology, and biophysics. It was established in 2012 and is published by MDPI. The founding editor-in-chief is Alexander E. Kalyuzhny (University of Minnesota) who was joined by Cord Brakebusch (University of Copenhagen) in 2020.

Abstracting and indexing
The journal is abstracted and indexed in:
Biological Abstracts
BIOSIS Previews
EBSCO databases
Embase
Index Medicus/MEDLINE/PubMed
Science Citation Index Expanded
Scopus
According to the Journal Citation Reports, the journal has a 2021 impact factor of 7.666.

References

External links

English-language journals
MDPI academic journals
Publications established in 2012
Monthly journals
Molecular and cellular biology journals